Samokovo is a village in the municipality of Kuršumlija, Serbia. According to the 2002 census, the village has a population of 61 people. This village is mentioned by Pjeter Bogdani as "Samocovo" and with a former name "Hecur" in his book "Cuneus Prophetarum"(1685).

References

Populated places in Toplica District